Ziyuan County is a county in the northeast of Guangxi, China, bordering Hunan province to the north. It is under the administration of the prefecture-level city of Guilin.

Languages
The Ziyuan County Gazetteer lists the following languages and their respective distributions.
Chinese
Miao: in Chetian 车田苗族乡; Liangtian 两水苗族乡; Hekou 河口瑶族乡 (in Dawan 大湾, Congping 葱坪); Meixi 梅溪乡 (in Chaping 茶坪)
Yao: in Hekou 河口瑶族乡 (in Congping 葱坪, Houbei 猴背, Gaoshan 高山); Liangshui 两水苗族乡 (in Fengshui 凤水, Sheshui 社水); Zhongfeng 中峰乡 (in Sheling 社岭, Bafang 八坊); Tingdong 延东乡 (in Shixitou 石溪头, Putian 浦田)

Climate

References

广西壮族自治区行政区划（2022年

Counties of Guangxi
Administrative divisions of Guilin